Theme for Monterey is an album by the Gerald Wilson Orchestra, recorded in 1997 and released on the MAMA label.

Reception

AllMusic's Scott Yanow noted: "In 1997, bandleader/arranger Gerald Wilson was commissioned by the Monterey Jazz Festival to write an original piece to be performed at that year's festival. Wilson's goal was to compose a melody that the audience would leave the venue singing to themselves. He succeeded by casting his 'Theme for Monterey' in five different styles, with his big band interpreting the theme in a variety of moods—as a ballad, a Latin romp, a medium-tempo piece and a shouting conclusion... Highly recommended". In JazzTimes, Bill Bennett wrote: "Throughout, Wilson's dense orchestrations hinge on sharp accents and grand sweep and provide surging support for strong solos".

Track listing 
All compositions by Gerald Wilson except where noted.
 "Theme for Monterey: Romance" - 6:29
 "Theme for Monterey: Lyon's Roar" - 12:18
 "Theme for Monterey: The Lone Cypress" - 9:30
 "Theme for Monterey: Spanish Bay" - 8:49
 "Theme for Monterey: Cookin' on Cannery Row" - 6:51
 "Summertime" (George Gershwin, Ira Gershwin, DuBose Heyward) - 13:27
 "Anthropology" (Charlie Parker, Dizzy Gillespie) - 5:51

Personnel 
Gerald Wilson - arranger, conductor
Ron Barrows, Oscar Brashear, Carl Saunders, Snooky Young, Dave Krimsley - trumpet
Leslie Benedict, George Bohanon, Isaac Smith - trombone
Louis Taylor - soprano saxophone
Scott Mayo - soprano saxophone, alto saxophone, tenor saxophone
Randall Willis - alto saxophone, tenor saxophone
Carl Randall - tenor saxophone
Jack Nimitz - baritone saxophone
Brian O'Rourke - piano
Eric Veliotes, Anthony Wilson - guitar 
Trey Henry - bass 
Mel Lee - drums

References 

Gerald Wilson albums
1997 albums
Albums arranged by Gerald Wilson
Albums conducted by Gerald Wilson

Albums recorded at Capitol Studios